The Late-May 1998 tornado outbreak and derecho was a historic tornado outbreak and derecho that began on the afternoon of May 30 and extended throughout May 31, 1998, across a large portion of the northern half of the United States and southern Ontario from southeastern Montana east and southeastward to the Atlantic Ocean. The initial tornado outbreak, including the devastating Spencer tornado, hit southeast South Dakota on the evening of May 30. The Spencer tornado was the most destructive and the second-deadliest tornado in South Dakota history.  A total of 13 people were killed; 7 by tornadoes and 6 by the derecho. Over two million people lost electrical power, some for up to 10 days.

The derecho was the most violent line of thunderstorms observed on earth during the 1998 calendar year according to the National Weather Service review shortly after the year was over. It was the climax of an unusually heavy derecho season in the North-Central United States and adjacent parts of Canada and the Northeast United States, and this storm combined the characteristics of the two major forms of derecho, the serial and progressive derecho. At various points of its evolution, it displayed textbook or record manifestations of supercell and derecho-related phenomena such as the right-mover supercell, evolution of supercells into a linear meso-scale feature which rapidly became a derecho, cumulonimbus with overshooting top and dome, bow echo, bookend vortices, regular and rotor downbursts, gust front, gustnado, rear inflow notch, classic derecho radar signature, effects of infrasound and atmospheric electricity, haboobs, and wind effects on bodies of water including seiches and exposure of bottoms of water features by the wind. The disturbance which was originally the derecho finally disappeared off the coast of Norway more than a week later.

May 30 South Dakota event

The first severe weather of the outbreak was reported at 12:30 p.m. in southeast Montana. Several hours later a supercell thunderstorm produced  hail across southeast Montana, kicking off the outbreak in earnest. The hail itself produced thousands of dollars in damage. Many reports of severe straight-line winds and damage were also reported. Numerous storm chaser reports suggest that significant severe weather events also occurred in the sparsely populated area traversed by the storm.

Later that evening, a supercell in southeastern South Dakota produced a series of tornadoes. The family of tornadoes that crossed the Spencer area was observed by a Doppler On Wheels (DOW) radar (Wurman et al. 1997, Wurman 2001). The DOW observed the tornadoes from before 8:04 through 8:45 pm local time (01:04–01:45 UTC)(Alexander and Wurman 2005) and the passage of a destructive F4 tornado through Spencer itself from 8:37-8:38 (01:37-01:38 UTC). DOW measurements of tornadic winds over the largely destroyed southern portion of Spencer have permitted the first (and only as of December 2006) direct comparison of measured winds with F (or EF) Scale damage ratings as reported in the above referenced articles. Peak observed Doppler winds of near  corresponded well with the documented F4 damage.

The DOW observations showed that the list of tornadoes derived from damage surveys alone, and the F-scale rating of that damage, may be incomplete and underestimate actual tornado intensity (Wurman and Alexander 2005). Single tornadoes may be mis-characterized as multiple tornadoes due to breaks in the observed damage. DOW measurements suggest that the F4 tornado may have a multiple-vortex structure as it struck Spencer.

Confirmed tornadoes

May 30 event (South Dakota)

May 30 event (Derecho)

Spencer, South Dakota

The Spencer, South Dakota F4 tornado was the most destructive and second deadliest tornado in the history of the state. It was also the fifth deadliest tornado of the year. It began as a large, dust-cloaked tornado northwest of Farmer, South Dakota in Hanson County, concurrent with the demise of the "Fulton" tornado. Continuing toward the east-southeast, it struck several farmsteads before crossing the Hanson/McCook County line a half mile west-northwest of Spencer. At this time, the tornado was being observed by University of Oklahoma's Doppler on Wheels crew, whose mobile Doppler radar data showed up to 220 mph winds in the tornado only a few decameters above the ground.

Several homes in town were swept from their foundations by the tornado. The tornado killed six people, injured 150 (which is more than one-third of the town residents), and destroyed most of the town's 190 buildings. Many trees and power lines were downed, and vehicles were destroyed as well. 5 of the 6 fatalities occurred in an apartment building that collapsed. Damage was estimated at $18 million. The population of the town diminished soon after to less than half of what it was previous to the tornado, from 315 to 145 in April 1999.

May 30–31 Southern Great Lakes derecho

This derecho got its start from a developing low pressure system that moved into the northern Great Plains and Great Lakes. The derecho formed from the same storm system that spawned the Spencer, South Dakota Tornado, which killed six people. The supercell thunderstorm which produced that tornado transitioned into the derecho which killed another six people. It would become the most destructive natural disaster to hit the Upper Midwest in recent memory.

Minnesota
The most damage in Minnesota occurred at the northern edge in Sibley and McLeod Counties.

After the derecho raced through Minnesota, tens of thousands of trees were blown down. There were 500,000 customers without power. Over 100 homes were destroyed or damaged beyond repair. Twenty-two people were injured. The derecho caused $50 million in damage in southern Minnesota and northern Wisconsin.

Wisconsin
The derecho raced across Wisconsin in only three hours killing one person in Washington County when a tree fell through the roof and onto her bed where she was sleeping. It injured 37 people in Wisconsin. Many utility companies and emergency customers said that this was the most damaging straight-line wind thunderstorm event in 100 years. Five thousand homes and businesses were damaged and 24 were destroyed.

As with other derechos like the July 4, 1977 blow-down in northern Wisconsin, there were other unofficial reports of higher winds as well as estimates of such, including winds of  sustained for a number of minutes and gusts up to  also in Dodge County and/or adjacent sections of Fond du Lac County.

Road signs and other metal structures were found thrown about and even violently twisted in the area of 100 mph-plus wind from north-east Dane County through Dodge and Fond du Lac and Washington counties—evidence of both straight-line winds and rotor downbursts were widespread in this area as well as many other points along the path of the storm, and the sound of wind and perhaps hail and the effects of infrasound from some parts of the storm complex was also reported. In the latter case, some people reported strange feelings of pressure and dogs, cats, and raccoons went wild.

Central Great Lakes
Four people were killed in Michigan, and 146 were injured. Total damage was estimated at $172 million (1998 dollars). 250 homes and 34 businesses were destroyed. In Grand Haven the Story & Clark smokestack at the Piano Factory Condominiums was destroyed when the force of the high wind caused it to crumble, and trees collapsed all over the city, some falling onto roofs. Damage in Spring Lake was worse, due to a highly localized zone of higher winds. The Mill Pointe Condominiums suffered serious damage, including the collapse of one unit. Others were subsequently removed. A factory lost its roof in the storm, and a number of businesses were damaged severely, one beyond repair. Country Estates Mobile Home park also suffered serious damage.

This derecho would go on to break the record for biggest power outage ever in the state of Michigan (but later surpassed by the 2003 North America blackout). 860,000 people lost power, slightly more than the number from the Southern Great Lakes Derecho of 1991. It blew down five 345-kilovolt transmission towers owned by Consumers Energy.

A total of 13 counties in Central Lower Michigan were declared federal disaster areas.

One person drowned in Ontario when his boat turned over from the derecho's strong winds. Buildings in Toronto lost numerous windows and significant damage was observed in areas such as Trenton, Napanee, Picton and Kingston. Heavy thunderstorm activity was also reported in Ottawa and Montreal, but without damage.

It caused $300,000 worth of damage in central New York before reforming into a tornado outbreak at around 11 am on May 31.

Summary
It became one of the most damaging derecho events in North America's history, causing $300 million in damage.

May 31 New York and Pennsylvania tornadoes
On Sunday, May 31, Friday's cold front, which stalled over southern Pennsylvania, started moving quickly back northward as a warm front as strong low pressure approached the Great Lakes. North of the warm front, most of the Hudson Valley and Western New England were under a cool and stable marine air mass, as a result of southeast winds from the Atlantic Ocean. Around 8 am, the warm front was located roughly over the Mohawk River to central and northern Massachusetts, producing powerful thunderstorms. After the warm front's passage, sunshine broke out and strong heating commenced across the Northeast with temperatures quickly rising from the 50s through the 70s into the 80s, and dewpoints skyrocketing from the lower 40s into the upper 60s. surface winds began blowing from the southeast at around 30 mph, while the winds at mid-levels were from the southwest at 60 to 80 mph, and the winds at jetstream level were still ranging from 120 to 150 mph from the west. High levels of instability were present as well. This created an unusually highly sheared environment in the Northeast.

The Storm Prediction Center issued a High Risk for severe thunderstorms across Northern Pennsylvania, most of New York, Western Massachusetts and Western Vermont. A High Risk had never before been issued for the Northeastern United States, and hasn't been since this event. This indicated an abnormally dangerous weather situation for this region of the country, a situation more common in the Plains States and Midwest.

Around 1 pm, the Michigan derecho was moving into New York from Ontario and rapidly weakening. The decaying squall line broke apart into discrete convection over New York and Pennsylvania, which quickly re-intensified into tornadic supercells.

The most destructive tornado of the day was an F3 that tore through Mechanicville and the adjacent town of Stillwater. It caused major damage to Mechanicville's old industrial section located on Route 4 and 32 along the Hudson River. One of the two historic smokestacks (visible from 2 miles away) was knocked down by the tornado.  In 2005, the other smokestack and the conjoined building were bulldozed. The tornado was rated F3 (winds estimated at 200 MPH at the time) on the Fujita scale, and was 970 yards (0.55 miles) wide. In total, 70 homes and businesses were completely demolished, and hundreds more damaged. Extensive deforestation occurred along the path as well. 68 people were injured, but no loss of life occurred. Pink insulation was reported falling from the sky ahead of the tornado, in Valley Falls, New York, 12 miles east of Mechanicville. Film negatives from Mechanicville were reportedly found there as well.

Numerous other strong tornadoes touched down across upstate New York and Pennsylvania that evening, several of which reached F2 to F3 intensity. One F3 caused major damage in the city of Binghamton. The other F3 caused major damage in the village of Windsor. This outbreak was likely the most intense, widespread, and long duration severe weather event in modern New York state history. Other less intense tornadoes touched down in surrounding states.

Confirmed tornadoes

May 31 event

See also
 List of derecho events
 June 2012 North American derecho
 Derecho and tornado outbreak of April 4–5, 2011

References

External links
 "The Southern Great Lakes Derecho of 1998" (Storm Prediction Center)

 "Upper Midwest hit by hurricane-force storm" (CNN)
 Detailed SPC overview
 NWS overview
 CIMMS satellite imagery and meteorological analysis
 CSWR Doppler-on-wheels Spencer page

1998 meteorology
Hanson County, South Dakota
McCook County, South Dakota
Tornadoes in Michigan
Natural disasters in Minnesota
Natural disasters in Ontario
Tornadoes in New York (state)
Tornadoes in South Dakota
Tornadoes of 1998
F4 tornadoes by date
Tornadoes in New Hampshire
Tornadoes in Pennsylvania
Tornadoes in Indiana
Tornadoes in Ohio
Tornadoes in Kentucky
Tornadoes in Vermont
Tornadoes in Canada by date
Tornadoes in Wisconsin
May 1998 events
1998 disasters in Canada